Saratan is a rural locality (a selo) and the administrative centre of Saratanskoye Rural Settlement, Ulagansky District, the Altai Republic, Russia. The population was 749 as of 2016. There are 6 streets.

Geography 
Saratan is located 30 km southeast of Ulagan (the district's administrative centre) by road. Ulagan is the nearest rural locality.

References 

Rural localities in Ulagansky District